Abastumani is a small town in Georgia.

Abastumani may also refer to:

 Abastumani (Adigeni municipality), a village in Adigeni municipality, Georgia
 1390 Abastumani, a minor planet